Sir George Thomas Michael O'Brien  (Chinese: 柯布連) (5 November 1844 – 12 April 1906) was a British colonial official who served as Colonial Secretary of Hong Kong from 1892 to 1895, and as Governor of Fiji and High Commissioner for the Western Pacific from 1897 to June 1901.

Career 
O'Brien was the 19th Accountant General and Controller of Revenue of British Ceylon. He was appointed on 18 October 1890, succeeding W. H. Ravenscroft, and held the office until 31 July 1891. He was succeeded by J. A. Swettenham. He also served as Treasurer of Ceylon from 1886 to 1890.

He became Colonial Secretary of Hong Kong in 1892, a position he held until 1895. In 1897, he succeeded John Thurston as Governor of Fiji and High Commissioner for the Western Pacific. He was recalled in June 1901 following a conflict with the New Zealand Government led by Richard Seddon regarding a proposed Federation of Fiji and New Zealand.

He died in 1906.

O'Brien Road (柯布連道) in Wan Chai, Hong Kong was named after him.

References

|-

1844 births
1906 deaths
Auditors General of Sri Lanka
Chief Secretaries of Hong Kong
Governors of Fiji
High Commissioners for the Western Pacific
Knights Commander of the Order of St Michael and St George
Treasurers of Ceylon